Trine Haltvik (born March 23, 1965) is a Norwegian handball coach and former player. Currently she is coach for the Norwegian girls' under-17 team.

Haltvik started her handball career at just 16 for Byåsen IL, with the exception of a year playing for Remudas Gran Canaria in Spain, she remained at the club. Her loyalty and relative old age for a professional athlete, has given her the nickname "Mor" or Mother. She has played in 241 games for the Norwegian national team, scoring 834 goals.

She was voted World Player of the Year 1998 by the International Handball Federation.

References 

1965 births
Living people
Norwegian female handball players
Olympic handball players of Norway
Olympic silver medalists for Norway
Olympic bronze medalists for Norway
Handball players at the 1988 Summer Olympics
Handball players at the 1996 Summer Olympics
Handball players at the 2000 Summer Olympics
Sportspeople from Trondheim
Olympic medalists in handball
Medalists at the 2000 Summer Olympics
Medalists at the 1988 Summer Olympics
Expatriate handball players
Norwegian expatriate sportspeople in Spain
Norwegian handball coaches
Female sports coaches